The 1978 Princeton Tigers football team was an American football team that represented Princeton University during the 1978 NCAA Division I-A football season. Princeton finished seventh in the Ivy League.

In their first year under head coach Frank Navarro, the Tigers compiled a 2–5–2 record and were outscored 183 to 126. Gregory D. Bauman and Robert L. Ehrlich Jr. were the team captains.

Princeton's 1–4–2 conference record placed seventh in the Ivy League standings. The Tigers were outscored 147 to 113 by Ivy opponents.

Princeton played its home games at Palmer Stadium on the university campus in Princeton, New Jersey.

Schedule

References

Princeton
Princeton Tigers football seasons
Princeton Tigers football